Elements Pt. 1 is the ninth studio album by power metal band Stratovarius, released on 27 January 2003 through Nuclear Blast. The album reached No. 2 on the Finnish albums chart, as well as reaching the top 100 in four other countries. "Eagleheart" was released as a single, also reaching No. 2 on the Finnish singles chart.

Track listing

Personnel
Stratovarius
Timo Kotipelto – lead vocals
Timo Tolkki – guitar, engineering, record producer
Jens Johansson – keyboards
Jörg Michael – drums
Jari Kainulainen – bass guitar

Additional credits
Jonas Rannila – choir vocals (track 6)
Veijo Laine – accordion (track 4), arrangement (Joensuu City Orchestra), production (orchestra)
Juha Ikonen – orchestral leading
Mongo Aaltonen – orchestral percussion
Riku Niemi – orchestral percussion, conducting, production (orchestra)
Hilkka Kangasniemi – choirmaster
Mikko Karmila – engineering, mixing
Petri Pyykkönen – engineering (orchestra)
Juha Heininen – engineering (choir)
Mika Jussila – mastering

Chart performance

Album

Singles

References

External links
Elements Part1 at stratovarius.com

Stratovarius albums
2003 albums
Nuclear Blast albums